Monoplex pilearis, common name the hairy triton, is a species of medium-sized predatory sea snail, a marine gastropod mollusk in the family Cymatiidae.

Distribution
This species is widespread in the Atlantic, in the Red Sea and in the Indo-Western Pacific from East and South Africa, to eastern Polynesia, north to southern Japan and Hawaii and south to southern Queensland.

(Monoplex martinianus) This marine species occurs from Florida in the United States to Brazil, Bermudas, Canary Islands, Liberia to Gabon, and Ascension Island

Habitat
This tropical benthic sea snails can be found at a depth range of 0 – 50 m.
They mainly live on hard and coarse detritic bottoms, in coral reef areas.

Description
These large shells are elongate with a tall spire and a strongly inflated  body  whorl. They show a yellowish-brown surface with chestnut- brown spiral ribs. The columella and the aperture are dark brown with white teeth. The outer sculpture is relatively fine, with long inner ridges of the outer lip, extending deep into the aperture.

Biology
These sea snails are active predators. They are reported as feeding on bivalves. Eggs are laid on the substrate in large capsules clustered in masses.

References

 Gofas, S.; Le Renard, J.; Bouchet, P. (2001). Mollusca. in: Costello, M.J. et al. (eds), European Register of Marine Species: a check-list of the marine species in Europe and a bibliography of guides to their identification. Patrimoines Naturels. 50: 180-213
 Beu, A. (2010). Catalogue of Tonnoidea

External links
 d'Orbigny A. (1841-1853). Mollusques. In: R. de la Sagra (ed.). Histoire physique, politique et naturelle de l'Ile de Cuba. Arthus Bertrand, Paris. Vol 1: 1-264 pp. 1-240, pls 1-10?, 1841; 241-264, 1842; Vol. 2: 1-380 [pp. 1–112, pls 10-21?, 1842; 113-128, 1844; 129-224, pls 22-25?, 1847; 225-380, pls 26-28, 1853]
 Adams, C. B. 1850. Description of supposed new species of marine shells which inhabit Jamaica. Contributions to Conchology, 4: 56-68, 109-123
 Rosenberg, G.; Moretzsohn, F.; García, E. F. (2009). Gastropoda (Mollusca) of the Gulf of Mexico, Pp. 579–699 in: Felder, D.L. and D.K. Camp (eds.), Gulf of Mexico–Origins, Waters, and Biota. Texas A&M Press, College Station, Texas
 Calkins W.W. (1878). Catalogue of the marine shells of Florida, with notes and descriptions of several new species. Proceedings of the Davenport Academy of Natural Sciences. 2: 232-252, 357
 Gastropods.com: Monoplex pilearis

Cymatiidae
Taxa named by Carl Linnaeus
Gastropods described in 1758